Yongin Citizen Football Club was a South Korean football club based in the city of Yongin. It was a member of the K3 League, an amateur league and the fourth tier of league football in South Korea, but withdrew from the league in 2010 due to financial difficulties.

K3 League (2007–2019) clubs
C
Sport in Gyeonggi Province
2007 establishments in South Korea
2011 disestablishments in South Korea
Association football clubs established in 2007
Association football clubs disestablished in 2011
Sport in Yongin